Udaan (meaning Flight) is  an Indian television series that aired on  Doordarshan from 1989 to 1991 The serial was written and directed by Kavita Chaudhary who was also the main lead of the serial It also starred Shekhar Kapur in an important role.

The show was based on the struggle of a woman aspiring to be an IPS officer. It was probably the first Indian television show on women empowerment. The serial is inspired by true story of IPS Kanchan Choudhary Bhattacharya (Former Director General of Police) who after several hardships went to become the first female Director General of Police.She is elder sister of Kavita Chaudhary, director of show. The direction and performance of Kavita Chaudhary were applauded and loved by the media and the public.

It was so refreshing to see a lady IPS (Indian Police Service) officer in Kavita Chaudhary's role that was not only humble, but also wanted to perform her work in letter and spirit by going to the public and placing the public's needs ahead of everything else, in the true spirit of a public servant. Also, as happens in the US and other countries, Kavita portrayed her role of as a friend and guardian of the public who the public should want to go to for help, not a policewoman that everyone should fear. In fact in several episodes of this serial, Kalyani Singh IPS chastens her constables and other police officers for speaking with the public in a rude manner. This was  very refreshing.

When the serial ran in the late 80s and early 90s, there were several suggestions by the public and the media that all police officers including IPS officers could benefit from viewing this serial and learning from it. The other point to be noted is that at the time this serial aired, it was not commonplace for women to seek to join the elite government services in India such as the IAS (Indian Administrative Service), IPS (Indian Police Service) or the IFS (Indian Foreign Service). But this has since changed. As of 2010, the number of women joining the elite Indian government services, especially the IAS, has increased drastically compared to the 1980s and the 1990s. The entire "Udaan" TV series (30 episodes) have now been released in India in DVD/VCD format by Reliance (as of 2011), and are available to be purchased by the public.

Plot
It was a story of a girl named Kalyani Singh who joined the police force and with her hard work and sheer determination. Kalyani's father played by Vikram Gokhale loses all his land after it is forcibly taken away from him. Also Kalyani feels neglected when all attention is showered on a boy born in their family who is considered to be the male heir of the family. Kalyani's father tells her she is no less than anybody and should make it her mission to take the flight (Udaan) to a respectable position in the society. She vows to become a police officer and bring back respect to her family.

The story shows how she battles gender discrimination and various problems before successfully becoming a Police Officer. Shekhar Kapur plays the love interest of Kalyani in the serial. In this serial, Kalyani Singh brings out how a police officer and an IPS officer should truly be—a friend, guardian and protector of the public and public interests and one that honest and law-abiding citizens should never fear. It also brings out through Kalyani Singh's advice to her officers and constables the way they should behave and talk with the public—she chastens them to talk politely and in a helpful manner to every law-abiding citizen since they are public servants. Law-abiding citizens should never  have to fear the police, but must look to them for advise, guidance and protection from the unlawful forces. The director in Kalyani Singh did a marvelous job of sending a message to everyone, especially women in India, to work hard and achieve the ability to stand on their own legs and therefore gain respect in society, and to never give up until you achieve the rightful things you want to achieve.

Kalyani Singh's ideals are so high that even as an IAS (Indian Administrative Service) officer played by Shekhar Kapur is trying to impress and marry her, she carefully evaluates his ideals to see if they are compatible with her own, before  making a decision. The episode where a citizen is amazed that his request is approved by the IAS officer DM (district magistrate, an IAS officer, played by Shekhar Kapur) in such short time that the citizen questions if the request has indeed been approved already, and when the district magistrate assures him that it has, touches his feet with gratitude is very touching. In the same episode, when the PA (personal assistant) to the DM tries to present various bureaucratic hurdles to prevent quick approval of the citizen's case, the director is sending a subtle message when she has the DM respond, "rules are made to make us work in an orderly manner, but should not be used to put hurdles  to make the public frustrated".

The serial ends with the director showing us that when the public have the strength to stand up against injustice in society, then justice can prevail and the public themselves can benefit from such initiatives. The last scene shows Kalyani Singh and her family driving off towards her place of posting after attending a public meeting, while a voice in the background explains and justifies the "udaan" that Kalyani Singh IPS has been through.

Cast
 Kavita Chaudhary as Kalyani Singh
 Shekhar Kapur as Harish Menon
 Uttara Baokar as Janki 
 Dr. Anil Kumar Rastogi
 Vikram Gokhale as Brij Mohan 
 Ranvijay Thakur
 Kanchan Choudhary Bhattacharya
 Akhilendra Mishra as Hardayal Singh
 Satish Kaushik
 Suraj Thapar

References

External links
Udaan: Article and some clips from the TV Serial
Watch Udaan on YouTube

DD National original programming
Indian television series
1989 Indian television series debuts
1993 Indian television series endings
1980s Indian television series
Fictional portrayals of police departments in India